Walter Thomas McKeel (January 17, 1972 – January 1, 2019) was an American professional baseball player. He played parts of three seasons in Major League Baseball (MLB), between 1996 and 2002, for the Boston Red Sox and Colorado Rockies, primarily as a catcher.

Biography 
In a three-season MLB career, McKeel was a .250 hitter (4-for-16) and scored one run in 16 games. In 10 catching appearances, he posted a perfect 1.000 fielding percentage in 26 chances. He also appeared in one game as a first baseman, fielding two chances there without an error.

McKeel also played in the Boston, Detroit and Colorado minor league systems from 1990 to 2002. In a 13-season minor-league career, he hit .256 with 81 home runs and 390 RBI in 906 games.

McKeel was one of many replacement players who appeared during spring training in 1995 due to the MLB players strike.

McKeel was hospitalized in 2014, following a crash in which has was charged with driving under the influence, reportedly due to prescription medication. He died on January 1, 2019, aged 46 at his house in North Carolina.

See also
List of Major League Baseball replacement players

References

External links

1972 births
2019 deaths
People from Wilson, North Carolina
Major League Baseball catchers
Boston Red Sox players
Colorado Rockies players
Gulf Coast Red Sox players
Lynchburg Red Sox players
Sarasota Red Sox players
New Britain Red Sox players
Trenton Thunder players
Pawtucket Red Sox players
Toledo Mud Hens players
Sonoma County Crushers players
Carolina Mudcats players
Colorado Springs Sky Sox players
Baseball players from North Carolina